Cockburn ARC is an aquatic and recreation centre located in the southern Perth suburb of Cockburn Central. The facility also contains the administrative and training headquarters of professional Australian Football League club the Fremantle Football Club.

Community use 
The ARC is owned and operated by the City of Cockburn which provides community access to most of the facilities. There are indoor and outdoor aquatic facilities as well as basketball courts. Swim, fitness and sports classes are available. The centre features three water slides that opened in May 2017.

Fremantle Football Club 
After being previous based at Fremantle Oval, in February 2015 the Fremantle Football Club announced that it would move to the new facility. Construction of the $109 million facility began later that year. The major features of the facility include:
 The Victor George Kailis Oval; an Australian rules football sized oval that is Fremantle's primary outdoor training facility. The oval features embankments and standing room for approximately 3,000 spectators. It is equipped with a GPS program that shows instantly where goal posts and markings can be moved to replicate other stadium dimensions
 Indoor training centre with half a football oval marked across six basketball courts (also available for community use)
 Aquatic recovery, hydrotherapy and pools area, an altitude chamber with sleeping area for players and an indoor running track 
 Club function centre and a retail outlet
 Dedicated football department housing offices for the club's AFL/AFLW coaches and staff

The Dockers moved into the  facility in February 2017. The Victor  George Kailis name is in recognition of one of the club's founding member families, who were regular donors to the Fremantle Dockers Foundation. The venue hosted its first inter-club match in February 2023, when Fremantle played  in a pre-season practice match.

Awards 
 Community Facility of the Year Award — 2018 Parks and Leisure Australia Awards

See also
 Cockburn Central

References

External links
 Official website
 Cockburn ARC at fremantlefc.com.au
 
 Cockburn ARC (Victor George Kailis Oval) at Austadiums

Fremantle Football Club
City of Cockburn
1895 establishments in Australia